The little spotted woodpecker or green-backed woodpecker (Campethera cailliautii), is a species of bird in the family Picidae. It is native to large parts of tropical central Africa. It has an extensive range and is an uncommon species, and the International Union for Conservation of Nature has rated its conservation status as being of "least concern".

Taxonomy 
There are three subspecies:

 C. c. nyansae (Neumann, 1900) - southwestern Kenya and Ethiopia, northwestern Tanzania to eastern Democratic Republic of the Congo, northeastern Angola, and northern Zambia
 C. c. cailliautii (Malherbe, 1849) - south Somalia to northeast Tanzania
 C. c. loveridgei Hartert, E., 1920 - central Tanzania to Mozambique

The subspecies permista was transferred to the little green woodpecker (C. maculosa) by the International Ornithological Congress in 2022 due to similar plumage.

Description
The male has a scarlet crown flecked with black and a bright red nape. The female has a blackish crown spotted with white and a red nape. Both sexes have green upperparts, spotted with cream or yellow, and buff or white underparts, boldly spotted with black, and flanks barred with black. The tail is green, with individual feathers having brownish shafts. The supercilium is a white, the eye-ring grey with a chestnut iris, the beak grey tipped with black, and the legs and feet grey or olive. The juvenile is similar to the female in appearance, although the nape may have little red.

Distribution and habitat
The little spotted woodpecker is found in Angola, Burundi, Cameroon, Central African Republic, Republic of the Congo, the Democratic Republic of the Congo, Equatorial Guinea, Ethiopia, Gabon, Ghana, Kenya, Malawi, Mozambique, Nigeria, Rwanda, Somalia, Sudan, Tanzania, Togo, Uganda, Zambia, and Zimbabwe. The habitat varies across the range, being variously wet or dry forest, gallery forest or flooded forest, scrub, savannah, coastal woodland, palm oil plantations, gardens, or wooded villages.

Ecology
The little spotted woodpecker feeds mainly on ants and termites, which it finds on trees. It often forages in pairs or may form part of small groups of mixed bird species.

References

External links
 (Green-backed woodpecker = ) Little spotted woodpecker - Species text in The Atlas of Southern African Birds

little spotted woodpecker
Birds of East Africa
Birds of Central Africa
little spotted woodpecker
little spotted woodpecker
Taxonomy articles created by Polbot